Iron ore production in Africa is dominated by South Africa, Mauritania and Algeria. Many countries possess iron ore deposits that are as yet untapped/unmined. Countries and companies currently involved in production are listed here; measurements are in tonnes per annum(year).

Deposits

Algeria 
Deposits and production in Algeria include:
 2.3 mm TPA
 Entreprise Nationale du Fer et du Phosphate
 Mahavir Shree International
 Société de l'Ouenza
 Boukhadra

Angola 
Deposits and production in Angola include:
 deposits in Kassala-Kitungo, Cassinga, Chamuatete
 Malanje, Bié, Huambo, and Huíla provinces. See Mining in Angola

Cameroon
Deposits and production in Cameroon include:
 Lolabé – Mbalam – iron ore port
 Nkout – Afferro Mining
 Mbarga – iron ore deposit near Mbalam
 see extension in Congo-Brazzaville
 Ngovayang – Legend Mining

Central African Republic 
Deposits and production in Central African Republic include:
 Bambari and Bakala are iron ore deposits located approximately 1,500 km from the sea.

Congo (Brazzaville) 
Deposits and production in Congo (Brazzaville) include:
 Mayoko – in 2008 a possible iron ore mine is being considered Mayoko is already served by a narrow gauge railway branchline. The company is Exxaro Resources.
 new iron ore port at Indienne for Mayoko iron ore north of Pointe Noire.
 In 2007 privately owned British firm Mining Projects Development said it had found large deposits of iron ore at the Zanaga site in Lekoumou region, in the south of the country. Exploration work suggested there could be 500 million tonnes of ore. In 2008 the Brazzaville government said the project required investment of $2 billion, including a 300 km railway line to the port at Pointe Noire.
 In 2010, a map shows a connection to the Cameroon railway from Mbarga/Mbalam to the port of Kribi.
 Nabeba majority owned by Sundance Resources
 Letioukbala
 Avima
 Badondo

Côte d'Ivoire 
Deposits and production in Côte d'Ivoire include:
 deposits in Mount Nimba (on border with Guinea)
 Mount Kalayo Egypt 
Deposits and production in Egypt include:
 El Gedida
 El Bahariya
 Eastern Aswan near the Abo Alrish area hematite has been mined since 1962, but the work has been finished due to economical conditions such as transition of ore, sulfide and shortage of water at that height.

 Gabon 
Deposits and production in Gabon include:
 Bélinga – possible iron ore mine, with enhanced port and railway extension worth $3b.Mines and Communities: China to fund iron ore mining in Gabon
 Mékambo
 Kango

 Ghana 
Deposits and production in Ghana include:
 Yendi
 deposits being studied:
 Shieni
 Oppong Mansi
 Pudo
 Adum Banso

 Guinea 
Deposits and production in Guinea include:
 Simandou (South) – Diéké – exploration company is Rio.Global corporations compete for West African minerals. Wsws.org. Retrieved on 2010-09-29. – port Matakong
 ZogotaDate . (PDF) . Retrieved on 2010-09-29.
 Kalia, Guinea – Exploration company is Bellzone. – port Matakong
 Faranah – mining company is Bellzone
 Matakong – proposed port
 Mifergui-Nimba-Nzérékoré iron and steel project Didia – proposed port in Liberia east of Buchanan

 Liberia 
Deposits and production in Liberia include:
 Nimba – ArcelorMittal
 Putu
 Didia – proposed port for ore from Guinea
 Western Cluster – BHP
 240 km from Tokadeh mine to the sea port at Buchanan.

 Libya 
Deposits and production in Libya include:
 Proposed railway 800 km long for iron ore transport from the southern city of Sabha to the port at Misrata.

 Mali 
Deposits and production in Mali include:
 Bale 220 km (136 miles) west of Bamako.

 Mauritania 
Deposits and production in Mauritania include:
 Société Nationale Industrielle et Minière (SNIM)
 Askaf
 El Aouj
 Iron ore in Mauritania

 Nigeria 
Deposits and production in Nigeria include:
 National Iron Ore Mining Company in Itakpe, with both steel mill at Ajaokuta, Kogi State, and port at Warri, Delta State
 Agbaja for export

 Senegal 
Deposits and production in Senegal include:
 Miferso Company, exploring in Faleme; a Kumba Resources project''
 Bargny-Sendou – proposed deepwater port for iron ore

Sierra Leone 
Deposits and production in Sierra Leone include:
 Marampa – London Mining – Cape Lambert will need to build 34 km rail spur line to the existing railway. – operational 2012 – operational 2012
 Bagla Hills near east and near border with Liberia
 Tagrin Point – proposed port

South Africa 
Deposits and production include:
 With ~ 38 mm TPA, South Africa is the world's 7th largest producer.
 Kumba Resources / Exxaro – globally ranked producer
 Assmang (company) in Beeshoek, South Africa
 Highveld Steel and Vanadium Company in Mapochs, South Africa

Tunisia 
Deposits and production include:
 Tunisia produces about 200,000 TPA of pellets.

Uganda 
Deposits and production in Uganda include:
 Muko deposits in Kabale District, Kisoro District
 Sukulu deposits and Bukusu deposits in Tororo District

Zimbabwe 
Deposits and production in Zimbabwe include:
 Zimbabwe Iron and Steel Company (ZISCO)
 Ripple Creek

See also 

 Aluminium in Africa
 Cement in Africa
 Copper in Africa
 Platinum in Africa
 Titanium in Africa
 Uranium in Africa
 Mineral industry of Africa
 Major coal producing regions

References

External links
 Central and West Africa
 MBendi:Mining:Iron Ore
 MBendi:Mining:Iron Ore:South Africa
 Kumba Resources
 Journal: Mining Review Africa
 AfricaSteel
 MiningTopNews
 Reuters

Mining in South Africa
Mining in Mauritania
Mining in Algeria